Operation Saucer (literally, Operation Plate) was an investigation carried out between 1977 and 1978 by the Brazilian Air Force following alleged UFO sightings in the city of Colares. The investigation was closed after finding no unusual phenomena.

History

Precedent events
In 1977, numerous UFOs were reported in the Brazilian city of Colares, Pará. Local residents claimed that scars on their bodies were caused by the lights in the sky, and named the lights "Chupa Chupa" (literally Sucker-Sucker). Believing it would keep the lights away, residents of Colares organized night vigils, lit fires, and ignited fireworks. Mayor José Ildone Favacho Soeiro requested help from the Air Force.

The Operation
The operation was commanded by Captain Uyrangê Bolivar Soares Nogueira de Hollanda Lima. During late 1977, several pictures of lights were recorded but the military remained skeptical. After approximately four months, the operation was closed after finding no unusual phenomena. The official documents can be obtained from the Brazilian National Archives (Arquivo Nacional).

Conspiracy theories
In 1997, two decades after the operation, Captain Uyrangê gave an interview to Ufologists Ademar José Gevaerd and Marco Antônio Petit where he recounted his experiences living alongside his men. Three months after the interview, he was found dead in his home "after he seemingly hung himself using the belt of his bathrobe", attracting the interest of conspiracy theorists.

UFOlogists
According to ufologist Jacques Vallée, a number of individuals were reportedly killed as a result of the "lights" fired upon them by the UFOs, and injuries were consistent with radiation effects from microwaves. Other ufologists claimed that the lights from UFOs sucked blood from 400 people.

See also
 Chupacabra
 UFO sightings in Brazil

References

1977 in Brazil
1978 in Brazil
Brazilian Air Force
Government responses to UFOs
Military history of Brazil
UFO sightings in Brazil